Calvin Isufi (born 21 August 2001) is an Albanian footballer who plays as a midfielder.

Career statistics

Notes

References

2001 births
Living people
Albanian footballers
Association football midfielders
A.S. Pro Piacenza 1919 players
Serie C players
Albanian expatriate footballers
Expatriate footballers in Italy
Albanian expatriate sportspeople in Italy